France–Rwanda relations are the international relations between France and Rwanda.

History

Early relations 
France and Rwanda were allies during the reign of Habyarimana.

Rwandan genocide

Post genocide 
After the genocide, Rwanda sought to distance itself from France, with French institutions being closed, and the language of instruction in schools being switched from French to English. Rwanda also sought to align itself closer to other allies, including the US, the UK, and China, joining the British-led Commonwealth in 2009.

In 2010, during a visit to Rwanda, French President Nicolas Sarkozy acknowledged that France made "mistakes" during the genocide but did not offer an apology. His visit was the first French presidential visit to Rwanda since the genocide.

In May 2021, President of France Emmanuel Macron visited Rwanda, and acknowledged France's role in the genocide. However, like Sarkozy, he did not offer an official apology. Macron also promised 100,000 COVID-19 vaccines to Rwanda.

Resident diplomatic missions
 France has an embassy in Kigali.
 Rwanda has an embassy in Paris.

References 

Bilateral relations of Rwanda